Daniil Mikhailovich Kulikov (born 24 June 1998) is a Russian football player who plays as a defensive midfielder for FC Lokomotiv Moscow.

Club career
He made his debut in the Russian Professional Football League for FC Lokomotiv-Kazanka Moscow on 19 July 2017 in a game against FC Znamya Truda Orekhovo-Zuyevo.

He made his debut for the main squad of FC Lokomotiv Moscow on 31 October 2018 in a Russian Cup game against FC Yenisey Krasnoyarsk, as a 64th-minute substitute for Anton Miranchuk.

He made his Russian Premier League debut on 18 October 2019 in a game against FC Akhmat Grozny, substituting Luka Đorđević in the 32nd minute. He made his first appearance in the starting lineup on 1 December 2019 in a game against FC Dynamo Moscow.

Honours

Club
Lokomotiv Moscow
 Russian Cup: 2018–19, 2020–21

Career statistics

References

External links
 
 
 Profile by Russian Professional Football League

1998 births
People from Reutov
Sportspeople from Moscow Oblast
Living people
Russian footballers
Russia under-21 international footballers
Association football midfielders
FC Lokomotiv Moscow players
Russian Second League players
Russian Premier League players